The 1934 Oklahoma A&M Cowboys football team represented Oklahoma A&M College in the 1934 college football season. This was the 34th year of football at A&M and the first under Albert Exendine, who replaced Pappy Waldorf who left to coach Kansas State. The Cowboys played their home games at Lewis Field in Stillwater, Oklahoma. They finished the season 4–5–1, 1–1 in the Missouri Valley Conference.

Schedule

References

Oklahoma AandM
Oklahoma State Cowboys football seasons
Oklahoma AM